Phalaenopsis × amphitrite is a species of orchid native to the Philippines. It is a natural hybrid of Phalaenopsis sanderiana and Phalaenopsis stuartiana.

History
Like all known herbarium specimens from Friedrich Wilhelm Ludwig Kraenzlin, the type specimen faced destruction during the second world war in Berlin.

Conservation
This species appears to be unfrequent and uncommon.

References 

amphitrite
Orchid hybrids
Hybrid plants
Plant nothospecies
Interspecific plant hybrids
Plants described in 1892
Orchids of the Philippines